Pingmu is a town in Daozhen Gelao and Miao Autonomous County, Guizhou, China.

Administrative division
As of 2016, the town is divided into three villages:
 Pingmu
 Xingbao
 Shunhe

Geography

Economy
The town's economy is based on nearby mineral resources and agricultural resources. It is rich in limestone, silica, refractory clay and asbestos. The main cash crops are medicinal materials and tobacco.

References

Bibliography

Towns of Zunyi